Charles Zomphier (February 18, 1906 – January 31, 1973) was an American baseball second baseman in the Negro leagues. He played from 1927 to 1931 with several teams. After his playing days, he became an umpire in the Negro American League and in semi-pro leagues in the St. Louis, Missouri area.

References

External links
 and Seamheads

1906 births
1973 deaths
Birmingham Black Barons players
Cleveland Cubs players
Cleveland Elites players
Cleveland Hornets players
Cleveland Tigers (baseball) players
Memphis Red Sox players
St. Louis Giants players
St. Louis Stars (baseball) players
Baseball players from Missouri
20th-century African-American sportspeople
Baseball infielders